Boris Dlugosch (born 2 August 1968) is a German house music producer from Hamburg. Boris is usually known for funky/deep house tracks, mostly produced in conjunction with Mousse T. and Michi Lange, his partners in the Peppermint Jam Records label.

Career
Boris Dlugosch started his career as a DJ in the German night club Front in the Hammerbrook district of Hamburg. Dlugosch differed from his countrymen by playing house music tracks, instead of happy hardcore or trance, more established in Germany. As a producer, however, Dlugosch's first works, in the early 1990s, were in the happy hardcore genre, working alongside Gary D.

Dlugosch had a few occasional hits in the club circuit in the 1990s, beginning with the two tracks created with Mousse T. under the Booom! moniker, "Hold Your Head Up High" and "Keep Pushin, with vocals by Inaya Day, and "Check It Out (Everybody)", under the alias BMR (a regular partnership with Michi Lange). Dlugosch's name achieved some fame in the year 1999 thanks to his remix of Moloko's "Sing It Back", which became a club music phenomenon. He followed up under his own name with "Never Enough", a track that featured the voice of Moloko's vocalist Róisín Murphy. It peaked at #16 in the UK Singles Chart in June 2001.

Boris Dlugosch has also remixed dozens of songs, including tracks by Mariah Carey, Mary J. Blige, Jamiroquai, Italian rapper Jovanotti, disco band First Choice, and other well-known electronic music artists such as A-ha, Röyksopp, Moloko and Daft Punk.

Discography

Singles

Other productions
Dlugosch has collaborated on Spiller's "Groovejet (If This Ain't Love)", Fiorello's "Azzurro", Michi Lange's "Michi EP #2" and Princess Superstar's "I'm So Out Of Control". In 2013 Dlugosch played on the song "Step Together" by Joe Goddard of his EP, "Taking Over"

References

External links
 
 Official website

Club DJs
German house musicians
German dance musicians
Remixers
Living people
German DJs
Electronic dance music DJs
1968 births